Yunnan Lijiang may refer to:

Lijiang, a prefecture-level city in the northwest of Yunnan province, China
Yunnan Lijiang F.C., a professional Chinese football club